A plebiscite on Nova Scotia's prohibition of alcohol sales was held on October 31, 1929. Voters authorized the repeal of the Nova Scotia Temperance Act. This result opened the door to sales of alcohol in a government monopoly of liquor outlets and created the Nova Scotia Liquor Commission on May 1, 1930.

Background
In August 1927, Premier Edgar Nelson Rhodes stated “Prohibition by statute in my judgement is on all fours with the attitude of the Russian Soviets who believe in rule by force rather than rule by reason”. However, he did not schedule a plebiscite at that time. The provincial election of 1928 resulted in the Conservatives losing their majority of 37 seats and receiving a smaller majority of 3 seats. Two major issues in the campaign were prohibition and old age pensions.  After the election, the Royal Commission presented a report which recommended government control of liquor sales as a possible source of revenue for old age pensions. Premier Rhodes then scheduled a plebiscite.

Plebiscite questions
The plebiscite contained two questions.

The first question was as follows: 

The second question was as follows 

A majority of people voted yes on each question.

Results
Government control won a decisive victory in the plebiscite, 87,647 to 58,082. It received a majority in every county but six. Only the rural counties of Annapolis, Colchester, Hants, Kings, Queens and Shelburne voted in favour of continuing prohibition.

References

1929 elections in Canada
Referendums in Nova Scotia
1929 in Nova Scotia
October 1929 events
1929 referendums